The Indira Gandhi Prize, or the Indira Gandhi Peace Prize, also known as Indira Gandhi Prize for Peace, Disarmament and Development, is the prestigious award accorded annually by Indira Gandhi Memorial Trust to individuals or organisations in recognition of creative efforts toward promoting international peace, development and a new international economic order; ensuring that scientific discoveries are used for the larger good of humanity, and enlarging the scope of freedom. The prize carries a cash award of 2.5 million Indian rupees and a citation. A written work, in order to be eligible for consideration, should have been published. The panel constituted by the Indira Gandhi Memorial Trust consists of prominent national and international personalities including previous recipients. The recipients are chosen from a pool of national and international nominees.

Recipients

See also
Gandhi Peace Prize
 List of peace activists

References

Peace awards
Indian awards
Monuments and memorials to Indira Gandhi